The 1901 Buffalo football team represented the University of Buffalo as an independent during the 1901 college football season. In its first season under head coach James B. "Turk" Gordon, the team compiled a 4–2 record. Five games were canceled.

Schedule

References

Buffalo
Buffalo Bulls football seasons
Buffalo football